Tinker Hill is a summit in Putnam County, in the U.S. state of New York.

The hill was named for the fact that a jack of all trades, or a "tinkering" man, settled there ca. 1800.

References

Hills of New York (state)
Mountains of Putnam County, New York
Mountains of New York (state)
Geography of Putnam County, New York